Kim Jong-Hoon  (born December 17, 1980) is a South Korean football player. He formerly played for Chunnam Dragons, Gyeongnam FC, Busan I'Park in the K-League and South Korea second division side Gimhae City FC.

Career 
 Chunnam Dragons 2003-2005
 Busan Transportation Corporation FC 2006
 Gyeongnam FC 2007–2009
 Busan I'Park 2010
 Gimhae City FC 2011

External links 

1980 births
Living people
South Korean footballers
Jeonnam Dragons players
Gyeongnam FC players
Busan IPark players
Association football defenders
K League 1 players
Korea National League players